RK Crvena zvezda is a Serbian handball club based in Belgrade. They compete in the Serbian Handball Super League.

History
Founded in 1948, the club made its Yugoslav Championship debut in 1954. They subsequently won back-to-back championships in 1955 and 1956. In 1995–96, the club had its most successful season to date, winning the domestic double (league and cup) and reaching the Cup Winners' Cup semi-finals.

Crest, colours, supporters

Kits

Management

Team

Current squad 
Squad for the 2022–23 season

Technical staff
 Head coach:  Ratko Đurković
 Assistant coach:  Anton Bukilić
 Goalkeeping coach:  Željko Hornjak
 Physiotherapist:  Petar Radulović

Transfers

Transfers for the 2022–23 season

Joining 
  Branko Kankaraš (LP) from  Maccabi Rishon LeZion
  Rotem Segal (RB) from  Maccabi Rishon LeZion
  Petar Panić (LB) from  RK Rudar Kostolac
  Nikola Perić (GK) from  RK Dinamo Pančevo
  Miloš Bujišić (RB)
  Ramzi Majdoub (RW) 
  Uroš Kolundžić (RW)

Leaving 
  Branko Kankaraš (LP) to  RK Metaloplastika
  Marko Knežević (CB) to  RK Jugović

Previous squads

Honours and achievements
National Championships – 9
 Yugoslav League
 Winners (2): 1954–55, 1955–56
 Runners-up (3): 1957–58, 1982–83, 1985–86
 Third place (3): 1959–60, 1979–80, 1990–91

 Serbia and Montenegro League
 Winners (5): 1995–96, 1996–97, 1997–98, 2003–04, 2005–06
 Runners-up (2): 1992–93, 1994–95
 Third place (3): 1991–92, 1993–94, 2002–03

 Serbian League
 Winners (2): 2006–07, 2007–08
 Runners-up (2): 2009–10, 2010–11
 Third place (2): 2008–09, 2016–17

National Cups – 5
 Yugoslav Cup
 Winners (1): 1955–56
 Runners-up (4): 1974–75, 1983–84, 1990–91, 1991–92

 Serbia and Montenegro Cup
 Winners (3): 1994–95, 1995–96, 2003–04
 Runners-up (2): 1993–94, 1999–2000

 Serbian Cup
 Winners (1): 2016–17
 Runners-up (3): 2009–10, 2010–11, 2013–2014

National Super Cup – 1
 Serbian Super Cup
 Winners (1): 2017

Other Tournaments – 2
 Doboj Tournament
 Winners (2): 1974, 1989

International
 EHF Cup Winners' Cup
 Semi-finalists (1): 1995–96

Former club members

Notable former players

  Goran Aleksić (2007–2008)
  Danijel Anđelković (1996–2001)
  Aleksandar Blagojević (1992–1994)
  Igor Butulija (1982–1993)
  Vladimir Cupara (2012–2015)
  Marko Ćuruvija (1999–2003)
  Jovica Cvetković (1976–1984, 1985–1987)
  Nikola Eklemović (1996–1999)
  Petrit Fejzula (1970–1976, 1980–1982, 1985–1986)
  Tibor Ivanišević (2010–2013)
  Branko Kankaraš (2022–2023)
  Petar Kapisoda (1996–1998)
  Aleksandar Knežević (1992–1993)
  Nikola Kojić (1996–2001, 2003–2004)
  Milan Kosanović (2011–2012)
  Milan Lazarević (1967–1974)
  Blažo Lisičić (1993–1994)
  Nenad Maksić (1993–1995, 2006–2007, 2008)
  Nikola Manojlović (1999–2004)
  Nikola Marinovic (1996–2001)
  Dragan Marjanac (2004)
  Vladan Matić (1995–1997)
  Dejan Milosavljev (2016–2017)
  Marko Milosavljević (2017–2019)
  Žikica Milosavljević (1994–1999)
  Ivan Mošić (2016–2018)
  Draško Nenadić (2007–2010, 2021–)
  Petar Nenadić (2004–2007)
  Velibor Nenadić (1976–1986)
  Ivan Nikčević (1998–2005)
  Ratko Nikolić (1996–1999)
  Dejan Perić (1991–1993)
  Nenad Peruničić (1990–1993, 2007–2008, 2015)
  Predrag Peruničić (1995–1997)
  Vladimir Petrić (1994–1999)
  Nenad Puljezević (1990–1994, 1996–1998)
  Miljan Pušica (2010–2012)
  Dragan Škrbić (1988–1993)
  Darko Stanić (2002–2004)
  Goran Stojanović (1985–1988, 1995–1996)
  Vladica Stojanović (1999–2003)
  Rastko Stojković (1997–1998, 2003–2005, 2013)
  Branko Štrbac (1982–1987)
  Svetislav Verkić (2006–2007)
  Nenad Vučković (1999–2004)
  Nemanja Zelenović (2007–2011)
  Danijel Šarić (1996–1999)
  Božo Anđelić (2009–2012)
  Vuk Lazović (2014)
  Rade Mijatović (2007–2008)
  Mirko Milašević (2006–2008)
  Vladimir Osmajić (1997–2002)
  Žarko Pejović (2005–2008)
  Goran Stojanović (2000–2002)
  Stevan Vujović (2009–2010)
  Peter Pucelj (2011–2012)
  Ramzi Majdoub (2022–)

Former coaches

References

External links
 
 

Crvena zvezda
Handball clubs established in 1948
1948 establishments in Yugoslavia
Sport in Belgrade